Peter Urusov was a Tatar prince who killed False Dmitry II on 11 December 1610. The event was described by Hetman Stanisław Żółkiewski in his memoirs:

See also
False Dmitry II
Time of Troubles

References

16th-century births
17th-century deaths
Tatar people of Russia